Solnechny is a rural locality (a settlement) in Ustyuzhenskoye Rural Settlement, Ustyuzhensky District, Vologda Oblast, Russia. The population was 86 as of 2002. There are 8 streets.

Geography 
Bernyakovo is the nearest rural locality.

References 

Rural localities in Ustyuzhensky District